Allen Thomas Lambert, OC (1911 – October 25, 2002) was a Canadian banker and former Chairman of the Toronto-Dominion Bank.

Junior to General Manager
Fresh from high school at the age of fifteen, Allen Lambert joined a Victoria, British Columbia branch of the Bank of Toronto in 1927 as an $8-per-week junior clerk. He was recognized as a promising banker early in his career. His first manager reported that the young Lambert was "doing very well and seems to have a good grasp of his work. This boy has a good future." Promoted to Accountant in a Vancouver branch, he moved on to Brockville and then to the foreign exchange department at the Montreal main branch. He later observed that "We always tried to read something into every move and it was generally thought that if you were selected to go to Montreal someone had noticed you." After service as a naval officer in the North Atlantic during World War II, Lambert became manager of the Yellowknife branch during the gold boom of the late 1940s, and then began a rapid rise through the ranks. He became Assistant General Manager in 1953 and was one of those most intimately involved in the negotiations for the merger of the Bank of Toronto and the Dominion Bank in 1955. As General Manager of the new Toronto-Dominion Bank he managed the delicate business of uniting two corporate cultures and building a style and image for a renewed and ambitious organization.

Chief Executive Officer
Allen Lambert became President of The Toronto-Dominion Bank (TD) in 1960 and Chairman the following year. The bank was not in the first rank of financial institutions at that time, and he later recalled "we had all gone through a period of frustration at being smaller than the others, and not being quite able to compete fully." Over the eighteen years of Lambert's leadership, TD became Canada's fastest growing bank and a major presence on the international financial scene. Lambert toured the world seeking business opportunities, opening local offices, and building solid relationships with major clients. He was a tireless promoter of customer service, ensuring the Bank was an innovator in technology, and promoted progressive training and benefit programs for employees. He started TD's corporate art program and, as a centennial project in 1967, developed one of Canada's foremost collections of Inuit art. He combined a demanding life in business with a remarkable record of public and community service, chairing royal commissions and federal advisory bodies, serving as a member of international organizations, and acting as a frequent speaker and essayist on economic issues. Shortly before his retirement in 1976 he was appointed an Officer of the Order of Canada in recognition of his contributions to national life.

The TD Centre
Allen Lambert's most visible achievement, and a source of great personal pride, was the construction of the Toronto Dominion Centre. He viewed it as a tangible statement of the Bank's position in the forefront of industry. After rejecting a number of design proposals, Lambert turned to the great German/American architect Mies van der Rohe to develop a plan for a complex of buildings that would revolutionize the Toronto landscape. Now considered a Mies masterwork, the Centre is a lasting testament to Lambert's vision and imagination. William Thorsell, CEO of the Royal Ontario Museum, wrote in a tribute to Allen Lambert: "For those who build, it is not a question of whether a legacy remains, but what its quality is. In Athens, in the Yucatan, in Paris, architecture still speaks eloquently centuries after so much else of value is gone. In 1967, a banker insisted that Toronto be remembered with respect."

Honours
In 1976, he was made an Officer of the Order of Canada.

He was named to the Canadian Business Hall of Fame in the Class of 1985.

Over 170 Order of the Business Hall of Fame Companions serve as inspiring examples for all young Canadians and are featured in a display in the Allen Lambert Galleria located at Brookfield Place in Toronto, Ontario.

Additionally, he received numerous honorary degrees from several of the major Canadian institutions.

References
 

1911 births
2002 deaths
Canadian bank presidents
Members of the United Church of Canada
Officers of the Order of Canada